This is a list of short stories and novellas that have been made into feature films. The title of the work is followed by the work's author, the title of the film, and the year of the film. If a film has an alternate title based on geographical distribution, the title listed will be that of the widest distribution area.

0-9

A-E

F-L

M-R

S-Z

See also 
 Film adaptation
 Lists of film source material
 List of fiction works made into feature films
 List of non-fiction works made into feature films
 List of children's books made into feature films

Lists of films by source
Lists of works adapted into films
Films
Literature lists